"Fire + Water" is the 37th episode of Lost. It is the 12th episode of the second season. The episode was directed by Jack Bender, and written by Edward Kitsis and Adam Horowitz. It first aired on January 25, 2006, on ABC. The character of Charlie Pace (Dominic Monaghan) is featured in the episode's flashbacks.

Plot

Flashbacks
The episode begins with Charlie Pace, as a child, receiving a new piano. His family wants him to use his musical talent to "save" them and get them out of their current impoverished circumstance, but his father, dressed as a butcher, appears, saying, "He ain't savin' no one, he is," and cuts the head off of a doll with a cleaver. Later, Charlie, an adult, is seen in a hospital, where Karen, his brother Liam's girlfriend, has just given birth to a daughter, named Megan after Charlie and Liam's mother. However, Liam's increasing drug habit is causing problems: it prevented him from showing up at the birth, and is interfering with the brothers' band, DriveSHAFT. When Karen throws him out, Liam turns up on his brother's doorstep, but abuses Charlie's hospitality by secretly selling his piano, defensively claiming that he needed the money in order to travel to Australia to get a job and enter rehab, "for his family."

On the Island
Hearing a baby's cries, Charlie looks towards the ocean and sees Aaron's cradle floating away. He swims out to save the baby and brings him back to the beach, where Claire and Charlie's mother, dressed as angels, repeatedly call out to Charlie that he must "save the baby." Hurley also appears, dressed as John the Baptist. Charlie awakens from his dream, finding that he is holding Aaron on the beach, but with no memory of how it happened. A frantic Claire runs up and takes her baby back from Charlie and slaps him across the face.

When Charlie tells Eko about his dreams, Eko says that the dreams might mean that Charlie needs to save the baby, but Charlie misunderstands him. He goes to Claire to express his concerns about Aaron being in danger, meaning that they must baptize him, but Claire no longer trusts him after he repeatedly lied to her.

Charlie heads to his hidden stash of heroin-filled Virgin Mary statues, but Locke follows him and confiscates them, despite Charlie's protests that he was going to destroy them himself. Locke then stores the statues in the hatch, in the same room where the guns are being secured.

Later that evening, Charlie starts a fire as a diversion and steals Aaron from his crib. However, Claire notices him, and chases him to the ocean. Charlie tries to baptize him, and is reluctant to give Aaron back. He tries to convince the group that he was just trying to "save the baby." Eventually Locke persuades Charlie to give Aaron back, and hands him back to Claire. He then punches Charlie in the face three times, leaving him breathless and bloody. With him lying in the water, the surrounding crowd lingers for a moment and leaves without offering to help him.

Despite everything that happened, at the end of the episode, Claire seeks out Eko herself. At her request, he baptizes both her and Aaron.

Production
The episode is the subject of a detailed "Making of" documentary on the Season 2 DVD set. All of the locations for the episode, despite appearing to be filmed in different countries, were actually modified locations in Hawaii.

The producers had intended for the DriveSHAFT video to be a remake of the Beatles Abbey Road album cover, only with the bandmembers wearing diapers. However, they were unable to get permission to reproduce the scene, so instead used the diapers in a different way, singing inside of a crib while they wore the diapers.

In one of the dream sequences, Charlie's mother and Claire appear as angels. This was a reproduction of the Andrea del Verrocchio painting, The Baptism of Christ. In the background of the scene (only viewable in the widescreen format), an Easter Egg was introduced, where the Nigerian drug plane, the Beechcraft containing Eko's brother, can be briefly seen en route to its crash on the island.

Reception
The episode garnered 19.05 million American viewers. The LA Times saw this as the 109th best (or second worst) episode.

References

External links

"Fire + Water" at ABC

Lost (season 2) episodes
2006 American television episodes